Manoj Kumar Oraon is an Indian politician from BJP. In May 2021, he was elected as the member of the West Bengal Legislative Assembly from Kumargram.

Career
Oraon is from Kumargram, Alipurduar district. His father's name is Jit Bahan Oraon. He passed Bachelor of Education from Eastern Dooars B.Ed Training College, and Bhatibari Under North Bengal University in 2011. He contested in 2021 West Bengal Legislative Assembly election from Kumargram Vidhan Sabha and won the seat on 2 May 2021.

References

21st-century Indian politicians
Bharatiya Janata Party politicians from West Bengal
Year of birth missing (living people)
Living people
West Bengal MLAs 2021–2026

People from Alipurduar district